AirPrint is a feature in Apple Inc.'s macOS and iOS operating systems for printing 
without installing printer-specific drivers. Connection is via a wireless LAN (Wi-Fi), either directly to AirPrint-compatible printers, or to non-compatible shared printers by way of a computer running Microsoft Windows, Linux, or macOS. It was originally intended for iOS devices and connected via a Wi-Fi network only, and thus required a Wi-Fi access point.  However, with the introduction of AirPrint to the macOS desktop platform in 2012, Macs connected to the network via Ethernet connection could also print using the AirPrint protocol—not just those connected via Wi-Fi.  Direct Wi-Fi connection between the device and the printer is not supported by default, but has appeared as the 'HP ePrint Wireless Direct AirPrint' feature. It uses a proprietary page description language called Apple Raster.

History and printer compatibility
Following the iPad's introduction in 2010, user concerns were raised about the product's inability to print, at least through a supported Apple solution. Apple founder and CEO Steve Jobs reportedly replied "It will come" in May 2010 to a user request for printing.

AirPrint's Fall 2010 introduction, as part of iOS 4.2, gave iPhones and iPads printing capability for the first time.  AirPrint for Mac computers was introduced in the Mac OS X Lion release.

At launch, twelve printers were AirPrint compatible, all of them from the HP Photosmart Plus e-All-in-One series. As of July 2020, that number had grown to about 6,000 compatible printer models from two dozen different manufacturers. The current list can be found on Apple's support site.

Non-AirPrint printer support
A number of software solutions allow for non-AirPrint printers to be used with iOS devices, by configuring support on an intermediary system accessible via Wi-Fi, connected to the printer. Since AirPrint is driverless, such a configuration compensates for the printer's lack of native AirPrint support by using the drivers on the intermediary system instead.

The simplest solution for all platforms is to create a new Bonjour service that tricks iOS clients into believing they're talking to an AirPrint device. Many blog posts and commercial software products exist to accomplish this, as well as open-source solutions in Linux. This works in many cases because AirPrint is an extension of the Internet Printing Protocol (IPP), which many printers already support either directly, or as a result of being shared through an intermediary system (typically CUPS, the Mac/Linux printing system). This approach is limited however, as the AirPrint-specific components of the protocol are missing. This can lead to compatibility issues and unexpected results. Some software packages address this completely by translating between the two dialects of IPP, avoiding compatibility issues, while most just re-share printers using the AirPrint service name.

For Microsoft Windows, there are free and paid solutions.

On macOS, a Bonjour service exists that enables AirPrint support for non-AirPrint printers. Commercial macOS software for this purpose includes Netputing  and Ecamm Printopia.

In most Linux distributions, AirPrint support should be automatic with the CUPS default printing subsystem since version 1.4.6, which has been released on January 6, 2011 (e.g. in Ubuntu 11.04 and later or in Fedora 15 and later). CUPS servers before version 1.4.6 with DNS based Service Discovery can also be configured manually, by adding DNS-SD printer service discovery records to a name server.

Apps and utilities 
There are a number of third party solutions, available on the Apple App Store and elsewhere, that allow printing to non-AirPrint printers directly or via an application helper. Netgear Genie, for both Mac OS X 10.6 or above and Windows XP, Vista, 7 and 8. Genie permits any shared, network attached printer to be made accessible via AirPrint. The application is free for customers of current Netgear routers. Printopia Pro is a commercial solution designed to allow AirPrint to work on large business and education networks. It offers features useful to large organizations including centralized management, directory integration, and allows AirPrint to operate across subnets. It requires a server running Mac OS X 10.7 or later, and one server can potentially serve an entire organization.

See also
Google Cloud Print
Internet Printing Protocol
Mopria Alliance

References

IOS
Computer printing
Printing protocols